Jari Juhani Leppä (born 24 June 1959 in Pertunmaa, Finland) is a Finnish politician, representing the Centre Party. He has served as a Member of Parliament since 1999 and Minister of Agriculture since 2017 until his resignation in 29 April 2022.

References 

1959 births
Living people
People from Pertunmaa
Centre Party (Finland) politicians
Ministers of Agriculture of Finland
Forestry ministers of Finland
Members of the Parliament of Finland (1999–2003)
Members of the Parliament of Finland (2003–07)
Members of the Parliament of Finland (2007–11)
Members of the Parliament of Finland (2011–15)
Members of the Parliament of Finland (2015–19)
Members of the Parliament of Finland (2019–23)